Ilana Neumann, in full Ilana Neumann de Azar (b. 1968 or 1969), is a Dominican politician and lawyer.

Neumann was born in Sosúa to Avi Neumann (the son of Jewish refugees of World War II, who immigrated to the Dominican Republic; also an Israeli citizen) and Nieves Hernández, both natives of Sosúa. She is married to Cyrano Azar Ramírez, whose paternal grandparents (Aris Azar and Maria Hedded) were Lebanese immigrants.

Neumann was deputy for Puerto Plata Province from 2002 to 2010; elected in 2002 and re-elected in 2006. She was Mayor of Sosúa, elected in 2010, and re-elected in 2016.

Neumann is the first woman of Jewish descent to be elected as mayor in the Dominican Republic.

References

External links 
 

Living people
Date of birth missing (living people)
1960s births
People from Puerto Plata Province
Dominican Republic Jews
Dominican Republic people of Jewish descent
Dominican Republic people of German-Jewish descent
Dominican Republic people of Israeli descent
Dominican Revolutionary Party politicians
Members of the Chamber of Deputies of the Dominican Republic
Mayors of places in the Dominican Republic
Dominican Republic women lawyers
20th-century Dominican Republic lawyers
Women members of the Congress of the Dominican Republic
Women mayors of places in the Dominican Republic
21st-century Dominican Republic women politicians
21st-century Dominican Republic politicians

Jewish women politicians